Fencing has been contested at the Pan American Games since the inaugural games in 1951, without ever leaving the program.

At the 2011 Pan American Games, for the first time in history all twelve events were played for the first time. The last event was in 2015, when Toronto, Canada hosted.

Medal table

Medalists

References

 
Sports at the Pan American Games
Fencing
Pan American Games
Pan American Games